Uncial 0163 (in the Gregory-Aland numbering), is a Greek uncial manuscript of the New Testament, dated palaeographically to the 5th century.

Description 

The codex contains a small part of the Book of Revelation 16:17-20, on one parchment leaf (12 cm by 8.5 cm). It is written in one column per page, 17 lines per page, in small uncial letters.

The Greek text of this codex is a representative of the Alexandrian text-type. Aland placed it in Category III. The surviving fragment of text concurs with Codex Alexandrinus.

History 
Currently it is dated by the INTF to the 5th century.

The manuscript was found in Al-Bashnasa.

Text of the manuscript was published in 1908 by B. P. Grenfell and A. S. Hunt.

The codex currently is housed at the University of Chicago Oriental Institute (9351) (P. Oxy 848) in Chicago.

See also 

 List of New Testament uncials
 Oxyrhynchus Papyri
 Textual criticism
 Papyrus Oxyrhynchus 847
 Papyrus Oxyrhynchus 849

References

Further reading 

 B. P. Grenfell & A. S. Hunt, Oxyrhynchus Papyri VI, Egypt Exploration Fund (London 1908), p. 6.

External links 
 Uncial 0163 at the Goodspeed Manuscript Collection

Greek New Testament uncials
5th-century biblical manuscripts
848